The 'Nam was a war comic book series detailing the U.S. war in Vietnam from the perspective of active-duty soldiers involved in the conflict. It was written by Doug Murray, initially illustrated by Michael Golden, edited by Larry Hama and published by Marvel Comics for seven years beginning in 1986, which was originally intended to roughly parallel the analogous events of the period of major American military involvement in Vietnam from 1965 to 1973.

Plot
The comic is structured as the narrative of a fictional soldier, Private First Class Edward Marks (but sometimes following other characters), as he experiences real events that occurred during the conflict. Each issue of the comic occurs one month after the previous issue, detailing events that occurred approximately 20 years prior to the publication date.

The events depicted are sometimes famous ones, such as the Tet Offensive of 1968, and sometimes more personal ones, depicting the interaction between soldiers or between soldiers and the local populace of Vietnam, or between soldiers and their families, friends and others in the United States.

Some of the stories are typical of those in war comics of any era, such as the interaction with a callous officer or a description of combat, while others are unique to Vietnam, such as the experience of soldiers on leave bearing the personal burden of animosity from civilians opposed to the war. Issue #8 introduced the character of Frank Verzyl, the Tunnel Rat, who appeared again briefly in #26.

Publication history
Vietnam War veteran Larry Hama contacted fellow vet Doug Murray in 1984 about doing a Vietnam War series for his black-and-white magazine, Savage Tales Vol. 2. Hama teamed Murray up with artist Michael Golden and together they created The 5th of the 1st, which was well received. In 1986, Marvel Comics Editor-in-Chief Jim Shooter approached Hama with a mock-up of a comic book cover that was, as Hama remembers, "a color copy of the artwork from a G.I. Joe cover, one that showed an Infantryman in camo face paint peering through dense jungle foliage. A logo had been pasted over the art that read: THE 'NAM." Shooter told Hama to come up with a book to go along with the cover and produce it. Hama suggested that Murray put together a proposal for a regular comic book about the Vietnam War.

At the time, Golden was planning to work on Batman for DC Comics when Hama pitched him the concept for the comic book. Golden had grown tired of drawing superheroes and was looking to do something different: "Being part of that generation, I wanted to do this." Murray was surprised when Shooter greenlit the series, but felt that he "wanted to try different experiments in different subgenres". Even then, Murray figured that it might last for 12 issues, but it sold quite well, with the first issue outselling X-Men the month it came out.

Murray wanted to work on a Comics Code-approved series in order to reach a broader audience. He said, "I wanted a way to at least tell a part of the story to the kids and maybe get other people to talk about it as well." However, because of the Code, he was not able to address things like drug use or include swearing. Hama and Murray wanted to ignore politics and focus on the war from the average foot soldier's point of view. Murray said that the comic was "a pretty accurate view of the way the average soldier looked at the war. It was outside ordinary experience. The world was elsewhere." Murray decided to do the comic book in real-time so that one issue equaled one month to convey the concept of short-time.

He said, "Literally everybody had a calendar that kept track of how long they had to go in-country. I really wanted a way to kind of reflect that in the comic book." The actions of the 23rd Infantry were based on fact. This did not mean that they were in every action depicted in the book — only that that historical event actually occurred. In addition, every issue featured a back-of-the-book glossary explaining the authentic lingo of the characters.

Many changes occurred in the series after the first 12 issues; the use of newsprint was abandoned in favor of slicker paper with higher color intensity. Artist Michael Golden was also replaced. Murray left when changes in editorial policies took place. Don Daley took over and wanted to include superheroes and not continue the series in real-time. Had he continued with the book, Murray wanted the main character from the first year, Ed Marks, to come back to Vietnam as a reporter and deal with the subject of Agent Orange.

From 1988 to 1989, Marvel published ten issues of The 'Nam Magazine, which reprinted in black-and-white the first twenty issues of the comic on magazine-sized paper.

Vietnam veteran Don Lomax, creator of the independent title Vietnam Journal, took over writing duties for The 'Nam in the early 1990s. Flagging sales drove Marvel to place the then-popular character The Punisher in several guest appearances in The 'Nam during this period. After the series' conclusion, an epilogue of sorts was published in the form of a Punisher special, The Punisher in the 'Nam: Final Invasion, which included the unpublished issues #85 and 86.

The character Michael "Ice" Phillips would go on to reappear in The Punisher War Journal Vol. 1, #52-53, and The Punisher War Zone Vol. 1, #27-30.

Awards
During its run, The 'Nam was nominated for the Best New Series category of the 1987 Jack Kirby Awards.

Reaction
Marine Corps veteran and former Newsweek editor William Broyles, Jr., praised the comic for having "a certain gritty reality," but Jan Scruggs, President of the Vietnam Veterans Memorial Fund, questioned if the Vietnam War should be the subject of a comic book and if it might trivialize it. The comic has been praised by the Bravo Organization, a notable Vietnam veterans’ group, as the "best media portrayal of the Vietnam War," beating out Oliver Stone’s Platoon.

Collected editions
Volume 1 (collects The 'Nam #1-4), 1987, 96 pages, 
Volume 2 (collects The 'Nam #5-8), 1988, 96 pages, 
Volume 3 (collects The 'Nam #9-12), 1989, 96 pages, 
The 'Nam (collects The 'Nam #1-4), 1999, 96 pages, Marvel's Finest, 
The 'Nam (collects The 'Nam #1-10), 2009, 248 pages, 
The 'Nam (collects The 'Nam #11-20), 2010, 240 pages, 
The 'Nam (collects The 'Nam #21-30 and short stories from Savage Tales Vol. 2 #1 & 4), 2011, 248 pages, 
Punisher Invades the 'Nam (collects The 'Nam #52-53, #67-69, Punisher Invades The 'Nam: Final Invasion #1, Punisher War Journal #52-53, and Punisher War Zone #26-30), 2018, 352 pages,

References

Further reading

External links
 
 

1986 comics debuts
1993 comics endings
Punisher titles
Marvel Comics set during the Vietnam War